Undaground Legend is the first major-label studio album (second overall) by rapper Lil' Flip. The album debuted at #12 on the Billboard 200 with 70,000 copies sold in the first week released. The album was certified Platinum by the RIAA in December 2002 for shipping over a million copies. A sequel to the album was released in 2009 titled Underground Legend Part 2, It was released independently.

Track listing

Bonus CD

Charts

Weekly charts

Year-end charts

References

2002 albums
Lil' Flip albums
Loud Records albums
Columbia Records albums